José Miguel Gallardo (September 29, 1897 – July 18, 1976) was a professor at the University of Puerto Rico and two-time acting governor of Puerto Rico. He and his wife, fellow professor Ida Gallardo, lived most of their adult lives in Río Piedras, Puerto Rico.

Graduated from with a Bachelors in Arts from Park College. Received his M.A. degree at Pennsylvania State University.

He is most remembered today as a strong proponent of bilingual education, and he was appointed as Commissioner of Education in 1937 by President Franklin D. Roosevelt. His first task on taking the office was to increase the teaching of English in schools, in preference over Spanish. The intention was that while students would be taught in elementary school in Spanish, they would gradually be taught increasingly in English through high school. His revised education policies were reversed in 1942.

In 1941, he put the island on "war alert" after the Attack on Pearl Harbor.

References

External links
The Political Side of Bilingual Education
Some remembrances of him written by his nephew.

|-

1897 births
1976 deaths
20th-century American politicians
Governors of Puerto Rico
Park University alumni
Pennsylvania State University alumni
People from San Germán, Puerto Rico
Secretaries of Education of Puerto Rico
University of Puerto Rico faculty